This is a list of museums in Iceland.

Akranes Folk Museum
Akureyri Art Museum
Árbæjarsafn
Aurora Reykjavík
Aviation Museum of Iceland
Borgarnes Museum Safnahús Borgarfjarðar 
Bobby Fischer Center
Center for Icelandic Art
Duus Museum
Galleri Sudurgata 7
Gljúfrasteinn
Gufunes
Höfn Glacier Museum
Húsavík Whale Museum
Icelandic Museum of Design and Applied Art (Hönnunarsafn Íslands)
The Icelandic Museum of Rock 'n' Roll
Icelandic Phallological Museum
ICGV Óðinn
Museum of Icelandic Sorcery and Witchcraft
National Gallery of Iceland
National Museum of Iceland
Perlan
Reykjasafn (Byggðasafn Húnvetninga og Strandamanna)
Reykjavík 871±2
Reykjavik Art Museum
Reykjavik Maritime Museum
Reykjavík Municipal Archives
Safnasafnid Icelandic Folk and Outsider Art Museum
Skóbúðin - museum of everyday life
Technical Museum of East Iceland
The Transportation Museum at Ystafell
The Árnesinga Folk Museum
The Herring Era Museum
Vikin Maritime Museum
The Arctic Fox Center
The Exploration Museum
Þjóðveldisbærinn Stöng
Viking World museum
Íslendingur
Volcano House
Westfjords Heritage Museum
Whales of Iceland

See also

List of museums
Tourism in Iceland
Culture of Iceland

External links

 
Museums
Iceland
Museums
Museums
Iceland